Havoc is a 2005 American crime drama film starring Anne Hathaway and Bijou Phillips, with Shiri Appleby, Freddy Rodriguez, Joseph Gordon-Levitt, Channing Tatum, Michael Biehn, and Laura San Giacomo appearing in supporting roles. The film is about the lives of wealthy Los Angeles teenagers whose exposure to hip hop culture inspires them to imitate the gangster lifestyle and engage in slum tourism. They run into trouble when they encounter a gang of drug dealers, discovering they are not as street-wise as they had thought.

Written by Jessica Kaplan and Stephen Gaghan and directed by Barbara Kopple, the film was shown at several film festivals and then was released directly on DVD on November 29, 2005.

Plot
In a parking lot, teenage filmmaker Eric attempts to document the Wannabe's lifestyle enjoyed by Allison Lang  and her boyfriend Toby's gang of white upper-class teenagers living in the Pacific Palisades neighborhood. A brawl ensues between Toby's gang and another gang, which ends with both sides fleeing just before police arrive. Later that night, Toby's gang goes to a party at Eric's house, and Allison's relationship with Toby as well as her other friends Emily and Sam is further revealed. At the end of the party, Allison performs a blowjob on her boyfriend.

The next day, Allison meets with her father, Stuart, at work to discuss family problems, the awkward conversation revealing the virtually non-existent relationship Allison has with her parents. Afterwards, she and her friends drive downtown into East LA, intent on buying marijuana, eventually encountering Mexican drug dealer Hector and his crew. Toby and Hector make a deal, but Toby believes that Hector did not sell him enough for what he paid, and attempts to confront Hector, who pulls a gun on him, humiliating him in front of his friends. Allison persuades Hector to leave Toby alone.

The next night, Allison and her girlfriends return to the location of the drug deal. There, she and her friends once again meet up with Hector and his crew, who invite them to a party at his house. Before they leave, Hector informs Allison of a motel where his crew regularly party, and invites her to stop by if she wishes. The next day, Eric continues his film project at Allison's home, with Allison turning his interview of her into a bizarre mind-game.

That evening, Allison meets up with Hector again in a store, and he shows her around his neighborhood, while talking about his family and lifestyle. His guided tour abruptly ends when the police arrive in force, ostensibly on a drug bust. Allison winds up being arrested with the other present gang members, but – save for an argument with her parents and Toby – is let off the hook. The experience only serves to increase Allison's fascination with the inner-city lifestyle. The night after her release, Allison and Emily agree to head downtown the next evening to hang out with Hector's crew.

The two meet up with Hector and his gang at a motel, and a night of partying and drinking results in Allison and Emily asking Hector if they can join his crew. Hector informs them of their initiation; to join the gang, the two must roll a dice; the number they roll corresponds to the number of gang members they must have sex with.

Allison rolls a one, Emily rolls a three. Hector and Allison pair off, but Allison has second thoughts and refuses to have sex with him, and is thrown out of the room by the gang when she tries to get Emily to leave with her. Emily eagerly engages in sex with Hector, but as she does so, one of Hector's fellow gang members anally rapes her. When Allison storms the room and screams at the men to stop, they flee the room, leaving the two distraught women.

The next day, Allison returns to the motel and confronts Hector over the previous night, but he responds by saying he didn't do anything wrong; that he only did what she and Emily had asked him to do. At that moment, a woman shows up at the door, surprising Allison, much to the amusement of Hector, who mocks Allison for thinking he had feelings for her, and calling her a poser who only knows how to play games and nothing about the realities of gang life.

The same day Emily is shown at a police station accusing Hector and his crew of gang rape. Allison is brought in for questioning, but claims to know nothing about a rape. Hector is subsequently arrested, and members of his crew vow to seek out and silence Allison and Emily, but wind up getting lost in Bel-Air. Meanwhile, Toby and his gang are shown posing with guns in front of Eric and his video camera, making clear on their intent to seek revenge on Hector's crew. Eric later shows Allison the footage, and Allison subsequently calls Toby and makes an ill-fated attempt to convince him that there was no rape and what he is doing is foolish.

Allison informs Emily of what Toby plans to do and reveals to Emily's parents the events at the motel. This initially upsets Emily to the point of nearly attempting suicide, but eventually the two reconcile. Meanwhile, Toby and his gang arrive at Hector's motel and bust in violently, but only succeed in frightening a group of Latina women and a baby. Toby tries to work up the nerve to shoot them, but, consumed by their desperate pleas to not hurt the baby, realizes he can't and storms out.

On their drive home, the gang passes the SUV containing the members of Hector's crew that had been looking for Allison and Emily. The two gangs exchange looks, and the screen subsequently fades to black. After a few seconds the sounds of tires squealing, people shouting and gunfire are heard.

With Eric's film project complete, Allison concludes by stating that teens will be teens, but if adults are willing to reach out to them to connect and give them even just a small amount of insight, it's like that they now suddenly know everything.

Cast

 Anne Hathaway as Allison Lang
 Bijou Phillips as Emily
 Shiri Appleby as Amanda
 Michael Biehn as Stuart Lang
 Joseph Gordon-Levitt as Sam
 Matt O'Leary as Eric
 Freddy Rodriguez as Hector
 Laura San Giacomo as Joanna Lang
 Mike Vogel as Toby
 Raymond Cruz as Chino
 Alexis Dziena as Sasha
 Aaron Hernan as Tony
 Channing Tatum as Nick
 Arturo Peniche as Carlos
 Josh Peck as Josh Rubin
 Manuel Ojeda as Ricardo
 Francisco Gattorno as Luis Jose
 Nailea Norvida as Cindy
 Sam Hennings as Mr. Rubin
 Cecilia Peck as Mrs. Rubin
 JD Pardo as Todd Rosenberg
 Robert Shapiro as himself
 Sam Bottoms as Lt. Maris
 Laura Breckenridge as Runaway

Production
The original treatment of the script was written in 1993 by Jessica Kaplan, who was 14 years old at the time, and was based on her own observations of her affluent white classmates in West Los Angeles. Her script was sold to New Line Cinema two years later for $150,000. Originally titled The Powers That Be, the script went unused for seven years, eventually gaining traction with the studio after it received a re-write as well as a new title from Stephen Gaghan. On June 6, 2003, shortly before filming began, Kaplan was killed in a plane crash in Los Angeles, along with four other people, including her uncle. A dedication to Kaplan is shown preceding the credits at the end of the film.

Mandy Moore was originally cast as Allison, but dropped out and was replaced by her Princess Diaries co-star Hathaway shortly before filming began. Moore reportedly left the project because she felt uncomfortable with the film's subject matter. Jena Malone was originally set to play Emily, but left the project shortly after Moore's departure.

Principal photography took place around Southern California, including Los Angeles, Altadena, Brentwood, and Santa Monica, in the fall of 2003.

Release
Havoc was not given a theatrical release in the United States but received one overseas, grossing only $371,000 on a $9 million budget.

Critical reception
, the film has a 45% approval rating on Rotten Tomatoes, based on eleven reviews with an average rating of 5.30/10.

Lisa Nesselson of Variety claimed that the film "too often feels like a gussied-up '50s-style treatise about the dangers of nice girls flirting with social rebels," and suggested that the film be re-titled Slumming for Dummies. Maitland McDonagh of TV Guide stated that the picture was a minor effort that was even more disappointing after considering the highly regarded names who had worked on the film, most notably Academy Award-winners Kopple and Gaghan. Richard Roeper of the Chicago Sun-Times was among the few noted critics who praised the film, calling it "harrowing and authentic," and also claimed that it might have made his list of top 10 films for 2005 had it received a proper theatrical release in the U.S.

Various critics praised Hathaway's performance in the film, with Christopher Null stating that her turn proved "without a doubt that she has been underutilized as an actress for far too long."

See also
 Slum tourism

References

External links
 
 
 

2005 films
2005 crime drama films
2000s English-language films
2000s gang films
2005 independent films
2000s teen drama films
American crime drama films
American independent films
American teen drama films
Films directed by Barbara Kopple
Films scored by Cliff Martinez
Films set in Los Angeles
Films shot in Los Angeles
German crime drama films
English-language German films
German independent films
German teen films
Hood films
Juvenile sexuality in films
New Line Cinema films
New Line Cinema direct-to-video films
Films with screenplays by Stephen Gaghan
2000s Spanish-language films
Teen crime films
2000s American films
2000s German films
English-language crime drama films